Cornelis Gerardus "Cor" Tabak (2 July 1907 – 23 October 2001) was a Dutch male weightlifter, who competed in the lightweight category and represented the Netherlands at international competitions.  He competed at the 1928 Summer Olympics, finishing in 10th place.

References

2001 deaths
Weightlifters at the 1928 Summer Olympics
1907 births
Dutch male weightlifters
Olympic weightlifters of the Netherlands
Sportspeople from Beverwijk
20th-century Dutch people